Tomás Herrera Jr. (June 9, 1933 in Laredo, Texas – September 19, 1997 in Houston, Texas) had a long career as a professional baseball player and manager, beginning his professional career in 1953.

Herrera played in the minor leagues for at least six seasons, never reaching the major leagues - though he did spend parts of four seasons at the Open designation, which was created to help build the Pacific Coast League into a major league, and in the Mexican League, the highest-level professional league in Mexico. A pitcher, Herrera won as many as 10 games in a season, per the records available. 

From 1963 to 1969, Herrera managed the Mexico City Reds, leading them to first place finishes and de facto league championships in 1964 and 1968. He managed the Seraperos de Saltillo from 1970 to 1972, the Pericos de Puebla in 1973 and the Mineros de Coahuila in 1974 and 1975.

References

1933 births
1997 deaths
Baseball players from Texas
Mexican League baseball managers